Mommyblogs is a term reserved for blogs authored by women that are writing about family and motherhood, a subset of blogs about family-and-homemaking. These accounts of family and motherhood are sometimes anonymous. In other cases, women will achieve a sort of social media or blogger celebrity status through their digital life writing. Mommyblogs are often considered to be a part of the mamasphere. Mommyblogging can take place on traditional blogging platforms as well as in microblogging environments like those of popular social media sites (Twitter, Facebook, and Tumblr).

History
While mommyblogs have been around since the early 2000s, the term did not have a widespread use until closer to 2010. The exact dates for the emergence of this word are hard to establish because of the nature of the blogosphere. The use of the word mommyblog, grew in popularity in 2002 after Melinda Roberts founded a blog called "The Mommy Blog" to later appear on the Oprah Winfrey show and popularize the concept. The exact number of blogs that can be classified as mommyblogs is also hard to determine because of the large number of total blogs, which reaches over 150 million. But one way to trace the prevalence of the term moving into the 21st century can be traced through the increasing number of panels focused on mommyblogs at the annual women’s blogging conference, BlogHer.

Classifications
Mommyblogs can be classified in many different ways. For example, we can classify mommyblogs based on platform, content, genre, advertising, and religious affiliation among many other things. Mommyblogs often exist is clusters in which women create conversations within the mamasphere around topics or issues they are interested in.

Some of the popular classifications of mommyblogs include:

Content-based classifications 
 Academic mommyblogs
 Stay-at-home mother mommyblogs
 Crafty mommyblogs
 Advertising mommyblogs
 Crunchy mom mommyblogs
 Single parent mommyblogs
 Autistic awareness mommyblogs

Genre/Platform-based classification 
 Vlogs
 Blogger
 How-to
 Social Media

Advertising 
 Product-trial
 Couponing
 Multi-level marketing (Mary Kay, Lularoe)
 Etsy

Religion 
 Mormon mommyblogs
 Christian mommyblogs
 Southern Baptist mommyblogs
 Quiverfull mommyblogs

Reactions
Mommyblogs are received in numerous ways. Some women bloggers are uninterested in being classified as mommybloggers because they feel that men who occasionally write about family life and children are not automatically clustered into a group based on just that kind of content. Other women like Alice Bradley proclaim that mommyblogging is a radical act because it pushes motherhood into the public sphere through the digital. May Friedman writes that “mommyblogs gave [her] a response to the story of motherhood told from the outside and instead showed [her] motherhood and mothers, from within. Freidman’s scholarship suggests that mommyblogs reconfigure the narrative in which motherhood exists. When considering mommyblogs collectively they have led to an emergent shift in the story of motherhood and the role of mothers. Mommyblogs have been viewed as presenting numerous ways of thinking about motherhood that reject stereotypical depictions of mothers and women.

References 

Writers of blogs about home and family
Works about parenting